Tony Moly (Hangul: 토니모리) is a South Korean cosmetics brand.

Tony Moly was established in 2006 with the support of Tae Sung Industry. The name Tony Moly means "putting style into packaging".

History 
In July 2006, Tony Moly Cosmetics was launched with the support of Tae Sung Industry.

In April 2008, Soo Hwan Kang was appointed as the new president and 60 stores in Korea were opened.

In 2009, Tony Moly opened stores in Japan, Taiwan, Hong Kong, China, Vietnam and Myanmar. By November, it had over 120 stores in Korea.

In 2010, Kim Huonh Cheon was appointed as the new CEO and Tony Moly opened its 200th shop.

In 2011, Tony Moly opened its 300th shop and in April, Tony Moly opened its first store in the Philippines.

In August 2013, Tony Moly launched in Russia, opening two stores in Rostov-na-Donu and Ulan-Ude.

In 2013, Tony Moly opened its 10th single shop in Indonesia

In 2015, Tony Moly opened a flagship store in New York on July 13 

Also this year (2015), Tony Moly opened his official store in the Latin American country Colombia. It first began in the cities of Bogota and Medellin.

In 2016, Tony Moly achieved a total of 825 stores launched in 15 countries

Spokespersons and models
Kim Hyun-joong was Tony Moly's endorser for 3 years from 2007 to 2010. On 17 August 2010, Brown Eyed Girls became their new models along with actor Song Joong-ki
.

On 7 July 2011, T-ara became endorsers of Tony Moly.

On 17 September 2012, JYJ was chosen as endorsers of Tony Moly.

On 3 September 2013, Super Junior-M and f(x)'s Victoria were chosen as the new models of Tony Moly.

On 2 September  2014, Hyuna and B1A4 become Tony Moly's new models.

On 29 March 2018, BTOB become Tony Moly's new male model.

On 1 October 2018, amid heavy speculation within the Korean makeup industry, Monsta X became advertising models for its newest lip tint line with a guaranteed contract clause of 24 months.

References

External links

 Tony Moly Colombia
 Tony Moly official website
 Tony Moly international website
 Tony Moly Philippines
 Tony Moly Mexico
Tony Moly Russia
Tony Moly Belarus
Tony Moly Israel
Tony Moly Jordan

Cosmetics brands of South Korea
Companies based in Seoul
Chemical companies established in 2006